The John T. and Henry T. Reynolds Jr. House is a historic residence within the Springville Historic District in Springville, Utah, United States, that is listed on the National Register of Historic Places (NRHP).

Description
The house is located at 101 East 200 South and was built in 1910. It was designed by architect Lewis J. Whitney and was built with brickwork by Ed Child for John T. Reynolds.  The house was sold in 1919 to Henry T. "Harry" Reynolds Jr., whose family stayed in the house until 1983.

It was listed on the NRHP June 27, 1985.

See also

 National Register of Historic Places listings in Utah County, Utah

References

External links

Houses on the National Register of Historic Places in Utah
Victorian architecture in Utah
Houses completed in 1910
Houses in Utah County, Utah
National Register of Historic Places in Utah County, Utah
Buildings and structures in Springville, Utah